Frederick Palmer (January 29, 1873 – September 2, 1958) was an American journalist and writer.

Biography
Born in Pleasantville, Pennsylvania, Palmer attended Allegheny College in Meadville, Pennsylvania. He was the son of Amos F. Palmer; in February 1896, he married Elsie M. Wither.

The New York Press hired Palmer in 1895 as its London correspondent; and this opportunity evolved into a long career.

War correspondent

Palmer's 50 years as a war correspondent began when he was sent to cover the Greco-Turkish War of 1897 for the New York World and for Collier's magazine. He then covered the gold rush in northwestern Canada.  The Philippine–American War (1899–1902) provided an opportunity for him to cross the Pacific bound for Manila.

In 1900, Palmer went to China to cover the Boxer Rebellion (1900); and then he was sent to cover the Boer War (1899–1902) in South Africa.
Then the prospect of military conflict in Manchuria brought him back to China to cover the Russo-Japanese War (1904–1905)  for the New York Globe.

The New York Times sent Palmer to cover the Balkan War in 1912.

In 1914, Palmer was arrested in Mexico City while covering the Tampico Affair (1914) and the United States occupation of Veracruz for Everybody's Magazine.

World Wars
General John Pershing persuaded him to take on the task of press accreditation for the American Expeditionary Force (AEF). In this period, he was accorded the rank of Colonel.  Palmer subsequently became the first war correspondent to win the U.S. Army's Distinguished Service Medal.

Between World War I and World War II, Palmer wrote thirty-one books, including Our Greatest Battle, based on his World War I experiences. In his books, he provided an analysis of the future impact of weapons and strategies he had seen, and soon after the end of World War I predicted that a second world war was on the horizon. He was awarded an honorary doctorate from Princeton University  in 1935.

Palmer also wrote for the North American Newspaper Alliance in World War II, submitting from London and then Paris at least through April 1945.

Select works

 1897: Going to War in Greece
 1899: In the Klondyke
 1901: The Ways of the Service
 1904: With Kuroki in Manchuria
 1906: Lucy of the Stars, novel.
 1910: The Big Fellow, novel
 1910: Danbury Rodd: Aviator, novel
 1910: The Vagabond, novel
 1912: Over the Pass, Western novel
 1914: The Last Shot, novel about a fictional major European war from the point of view of a small set of soldiers and civilians, written before the start of World War I
 1916: My Year of the War, Palmer's account of his experiences as a journalist, starting the day World War I was declared
 1917: My Second Year of the War, Palmer's account of his second year as a World War I war correspondent
 1919: Our Greatest Battle, about the Meuse-Argonne
 1921: The Folly of Nations, tracing the causes of wars in general
 1933: With My Own Eyes, autobiography
 1934: Bliss, Peacemaker; the Life and Letters of General Tasker Howard Bliss, the only biography of the first American 'soldier-statesman" of the 20th century

Notes

References
 Haverstock, Nathan A. (1996).  Fifty Years at the Front: The Life of War Correspondent Frederick Palmer. Washington, D.C.: Brassey's.  ;  OCLC 33041795
 Roth, Mitchel P. and James Stuart Olson. (1997).  Historical Dictionary of War Journalism. Westport, Connecticut: Greenwood Publishing Group.  
 Hamilton, John M. (2010). In Many Wars by Many War Correspondents Louisiana State University Press.

External links

 
 New General Catalog of Old Books and Authors
 
 

1873 births
1958 deaths
20th-century American novelists
20th-century American memoirists
American male novelists
United States Army colonels
Military personnel from Pennsylvania
American autobiographers
American war correspondents
War correspondents of the Russo-Japanese War
War correspondents of the Balkan Wars
American people of World War I
Recipients of the Distinguished Service Medal (US Army)
20th-century American male writers
American male non-fiction writers
United States Army personnel of World War I